St. Michael Redoubt was a fortified trading and supply post established by the Russian-American Company in 1833, at the location of what is now the city of St. Michael, Alaska.  It is located on the southern shore of Norton Sound at a convenient location near the mouth of the Yukon River.  The fort, established by order of Ferdinand Wrangel, was used in following decades as a logistics point for exploration of southwestern Alaska and the Alaskan interior via the Yukon and other rivers.

The archaeological remains of the redoubt are located in the city of St. Michael.  They were listed on the National Register of Historic Places in 1977.

See also
National Register of Historic Places listings in Nome Census Area, Alaska
Russian colonization of North America

References

Archaeological sites on the National Register of Historic Places in Alaska
Buildings and structures completed in 1833
Buildings and structures in Nome Census Area, Alaska
Redoubts
Buildings and structures on the National Register of Historic Places in Nome Census Area, Alaska